John McCurdy is a professional baseball player who was drafted by the Oakland Athletics in the 1st round (26th) of the 2002 Major League Baseball draft out of the  University of Maryland, College Park after he was a member of Beane's List.

External links

Player bio from the University of Maryland

References

University of Maryland, College Park alumni
Baseball players from Pittsburgh
Living people
1981 births